Facklamia ignava is a Gram-positive bacteria from the family of Facklamia which has been isolated from humans.

References

External links
Type strain of Facklamia ignava at BacDive -  the Bacterial Diversity Metadatabase

Bacteria described in 1998
Lactobacillales